Walter Hayward-Young (1868–1920) was a British artist, also known as Hayward Young.

Educated at Warwick School, Hayward-Young's work, particularly his postcard designs (of which there are over 800), became renowned worldwide. He wrote a series of articles on sketching for The Girls Own Paper and Woman's Magazine which were later published as a book under the title Short Cuts to Sketching.

Hayward-Young signed many of his pieces under the pseudonym 'Jotter'.

In 1912, Hayward-Young designed posters for the London Underground, including one promoting visits to Hampton Court.

Musician Justin Hayward-Young is the great grandson of the artist.

References

1868 births
1920 deaths
19th-century British painters
British male painters
20th-century British painters
British draughtsmen
19th-century British male artists
20th-century British male artists